Camp Death III in 2D! is a Canadian horror comedy spoof movie, based on the Friday the 13th film series. On February 15, 2019, the film was released digitally via Amazon Prime.

Plot
It's been three years since Camp Crystal Meph was shut down after the murderous rampage of Johann Van Damme was put to an end by a foul-mouthed puppet. With Johann safely locked up in the asylum, the camp is re-opened as a rehabilitation center for the criminally insane. Crystal Meph is run by a team of grossly unqualified counselors, including the head counselor, Todd, a hopeful wimp ready to burst into tears at a moment's notice; his verbally abusive Uncle Mel, who keeps getting attacked in the face by the same damned squirrel; Todd’s love interest, Rachel, a traumatized survivor of Johann's previous massacre; and Barry, a wheelchair user who is the target of way too many handicap jokes.

Cast
 Dave Peniuk as Todd Boogjumper
 Angela Galanopoulos as Rachel Diaz
 Darren Andrichuk as Mel Boogjumper
 Emma Docker as Amy Henderson
 Chris Allen as Barry Brown
 Starlise Waschuk as Georgia Somers
 Cynthia Chalmers as Alice Wainwright
 Terry Mullet as Johann Van Damme
 Hans Potter as Shelby Hammersmith
 Katherine Alpen as Verta
 Jason Asuncion as Jesus Hernandez Jr.
 Andrea Bang as Angela Park
 Stephanie Bally as Waffle
 Léonie Armstrong as Rod
 Niall King as AIDS
 Kyle Fines as Officer Bert Gaybert Jr.
 Leslie Schwetz as Crazy Ethel
 Doug Naugler as Jester
 Caroe Sandoval as Mavis Boogjumper
 Allendra Patton as Young Johann
 Nikki Wallin as Becky Boogjumper
 Shawn Bordoff as Crapsey
 Molly Wilson as Claudia Clemp
 Janna MacDonald as Colleen Travis
 Jake Anthony as Arnold

Production
The film was partially financed by a successful crowdfunding campaign in August 2014.
Director Matt Frame helped to promote the crowdfunding campaign by partaking in a world record 24-hour, 109 km non-stop walk in which he chained a coconut to his waist. The subsequent media coverage resulted in the film raising 100% of its goal.

Filming
The film was shot over a 14-month period on Gabriola Island and lower mainland Vancouver, British Columbia, Canada.

Kill count
Camp Death III in 2D! has a number of on-screen deaths. The more than 80 on-screen kills were primarily the result of an open call for Vancouver actors to take part in an event called Night of the Living Deaths which was held in Vancouver's Gastown in May 2015. Camp Death III: The Final Summer makeup artist Deb Graf murdered 62 willing victims over the course of 8 hours. In a feature article in the Vancouver Sun Graf was quoted as saying: "We went full bore for almost 8 hours straight. I wasn't sure we could keep up that pace but somehow we did. I'm proud. Messy, but proud."

Title
Despite its title, Camp Death III in 2D! is not a sequel. Director Matt Frame explained the title by stating, "It's part of the joke. It's a spoof film. There are no parts 1 and 2, at least not yet." Camp Death III in 2D! is unrelated to the short film Camp Death (2006).

Release
The film was released on February 15, 2019 digitally via Amazon Prime.

References

External links
 
 
 Camp Death III In 2D! Director Hosting 48 Hour Streaming Marathon Featuring Cast And Crew

Canadian comedy horror films
Parodies of horror
English-language Canadian films
2019 comedy horror films
2019 films
2010s English-language films
2010s Canadian films